Heydariyeh is a village in South Khorasan Province, Iran

Heydariyeh may also refer to:
Heydariyeh Bozorg
Heydariyeh Kuchak
Heydariyeh Rural District